The following is an alphabetical list of members of the United States House of Representatives from the state of Utah.  For chronological tables of members of both houses of the United States Congress from the state (through the present day), see United States congressional delegations from Utah.  The list of names should be complete (as of January 3, 2021), but other data may be incomplete. It includes members who have represented both the state and the territory, both past and present.

Current members 
Updated January 3, 2021.
 : Blake Moore (R) (since 2021)
 : Chris Stewart (R) (since 2013)
 : John Curtis (R) (since 2017)
 : Burgess Owens (R) (since 2021)

List of representatives

See also

 United States congressional delegations from Utah
 List of United States senators from Utah
 Utah's congressional districts

References

External links 

 House of Representatives List of Members

 
 
Utah
United States representatives from Utah